Fiona Bell is a British actress, known for her role as Sergeant Angela McLeod in the ITV drama series Soldier Soldier (1997-1998), as Donna Killick in the BBC One crime drama series Shetland (2018) and as Hilary in the BBC One drama series The Nest (2020). Bell was born in Rosneath part of Argyll and Bute, Scotland.

Career
She took an interest in acting and joined the Scottish Youth Theatre, Glasgow at the age of 15. She graduated from the Royal Scottish Academy of Music and Drama with a BA Acting degree in 1986

Filmography

Film

Television

Theatre

Personal life
Bell is married to Irish actor Conor Mullen who she met on the set of Soldier Soldier in 1997. She moved to Ireland in 1997 to get married and lives in Howth, County Dublin with her husband and their four children: Keir, Hannah, Georgia, and Cassie.

References

External links
 

20th-century Scottish actresses
21st-century Scottish actresses
Alumni of the Royal Conservatoire of Scotland
Living people
Scottish film actresses
Scottish stage actresses
Scottish television actresses
Year of birth missing (living people)